|}

The Silver Trophy Chase is a Grade 2 National Hunt steeplechase in Great Britain which is open to horses aged five years or older. It is run on the New Course at Cheltenham over a distance of about 2 miles and 4½ furlongs (2 miles 4 furlongs and 127 yards, or 4,139 metres), and during its running there are seventeen fences to be jumped. It is a limited handicap race. It is scheduled to take place each year in mid April.

The event was established in 1986, and its original distance was 2 miles and 4 furlongs. It was given Grade 2 status in 1991, and it was extended to its present length in 1993. For a period it was a conditions race, but it became a limited handicap in 2003.

Records
Most successful horse (2 wins):
 Norton's Coin – 1989,1991

Leading jockey (3 wins):
 Tony McCoy – Upgrade (2000), Seebald (2004), Quazar (2005)
 Ruby Walsh – Poliantas (2003), Nycteos (2007), Poquelin (2011)

Leading trainer (4 wins):
 Martin Pipe – Beau Ranger (1988), Upgrade (2000), Seebald (2004), Our Vic (2006)
 Paul Nicholls – Fadalko (2002), Poliantas (2003), Nycteos (2007), Poquelin (2011)

Winners
 Weights given in stones and pounds.

See also
 Horse racing in Great Britain
 List of British National Hunt races

References

 Racing Post:

 pedigreequery.com – Silver Trophy Chase – Cheltenham.

External links
 Race Recordings 

National Hunt races in Great Britain
Cheltenham Racecourse
National Hunt chases
Recurring sporting events established in 1986
1986 establishments in England